The Deployable Tactical Engagement System is a training device manufactured by SAAB used by the British Army. It consists of an infrared projector mounted on the SA80 and the Vektor R4, and a harness with receptors to receive the beams to simulate hits when firing blank ammunition.

Users

References

See also
Small Arms Weapons Effects Simulator
Realistic Engagement And Combat Training System
Airsoft
Quasar
Military exercise
Paintball
Opposing force

Military lasers
Laser tag